The 2011 season is Lillestrøm SK's 22nd season in the Tippeligaen, and their 38th consecutive season in the top division of Norwegian football. It is Henning Berg's third season as the club's manager. On 27 October 2011 with Lillestrom in 12th place, Henning Berg was sacked and replaced by Petter Belsvik who took on a Caretaker role.

Squad

Out on loan

Transfers

In:

Out:

Competitions

Tippeligaen

Results summary

Results by round

Fixtures & results

Notes

League table

Norwegian Cup

Squad statistics

Appearances and goals

|-
|colspan="14"|Players who left Lillestrøm on loan:

|-
|colspan="14"|Players who appeared for Lillestrøm no longer at the club:

|}

Goal scorers

Disciplinary record

References

Lillestrøm SK seasons
Lillestrom